Andy Roesch (1906-1977) was a champion speed skater in the 1920s.

Roesch was born in Smithtown, New York in 1906, son of Main Street, Smithtown barbershop owner Andrew Roesch and his wife, Johanna Roesch.

Races
He won a three-mile race on Hessian Pond in New York in February 1927. He was a member of the first United States Speed Skating Team In 1929 he won the New York Silver Skates finishing the two-mile course in 6:52.

Roesch was nominated for the 1936 Olympics. He lost his amateur status, however, when he took a job teaching figure skating at the Brooklyn Ice Palace.

Later life
Roesch became a welder at the Jakobson Shipyard in Oyster Bay. In September 1976, at age 70, he fell while skating on a local pond and broke his neck. He died in 1977 in Newton, Massachusetts after spending time at the New England Spinal Cord Rehabilitation Center.

References

Additional sources
Chicago Daily News almanac listing of Roesch

1906 births
1977 deaths
American male speed skaters